A Night at Glimmingehus (Swedish: En natt på Glimmingehus) is a 1954 Swedish comedy film directed by Torgny Wickman and starring Edvard Persson, Bibi Andersson and Bengt Logardt. It was shot at the Sundbyberg Studios of Europa Film in Stockholm.

Synopsis
A university professor comes to spend his summer vacation at the castle of Glimmingehus.

Cast
 Edvard Persson as Nils Jeppsen  
 Bibi Andersson as Maj Månsson  
 Bengt Logardt as Holger Broman  
 Torsten Lilliecrona as Jesper Stenswärd  
 Nils Hallberg as Botolf 
 Gunilla Åkerréhn as Anne Stenswärd / Ingeborg Stenswärd  
 Harry Persson as Persson
 Ingeborg Nyberg as Inga-Lill  
 Brita Ulfberg as Marguerite Lenning  
 Sten Gester as van Düren  
 Astrid Bodin as Alma Månson 
 Ove Flodin as Svensson  
 Gun Holmqvist as Mrs. Stenswärd  
 Gunilla Kreuger as Gullan  
 Algot Larsson as G. Månsson  
 Max Lorentz as Page 
 Jan von Zweigbergk as Göran Stenswärd

References

Bibliography 
 Qvist, Per Olov & von Bagh, Peter. Guide to the Cinema of Sweden and Finland. Greenwood Publishing Group, 2000.

External links 
 
 

1954 films
1954 comedy films
Swedish comedy films
1950s Swedish-language films
Swedish black-and-white films
1950s Swedish films